Break Time: The National Pool Tour is a pocket billiards (pool) video game released for the Nintendo Entertainment System in 1993 exclusively for a North American audience.

Features
There are four unique challenges in the game, eight-ball, nine-ball, rotation, and straight pool. All four are allegedly played according to the professional (i.e. world standardized) rules.

 Four games
 Two-player support
 Practice mode
 Password save feature
 Trick shots
 Beat five pros in five cities

Reception
Electronic Games gave the game 71%. GamePro gave the game 4/5 for graphics, 3/5 for sound, 4/5 for control, 4.5/5 for Fun factor.

References

External links
Summary of game at Rotten Tomatoes

1993 video games
Cue sports video games
Nintendo Entertainment System games
Nintendo Entertainment System-only games
North America-exclusive video games
Video games developed in Japan